Overdose is the third extended play by South Korean-Chinese boy bands Exo-K and Exo-M. It was released by SM Entertainment and distributed by KT Music on May 7, 2014 in Korean and Chinese versions. It is preceded by their special EP album "Miracles in December" that was released in December 2013. This is the final release to include members Kris and Luhan before they left the group and filed lawsuits against SM Entertainment requesting contract termination. It is also the final album released by Exo-K and Exo-M.

Background and release
Exo-K and Exo-M's third EP was intended to be released on April 21, 2014, but its release was postponed due to the Sewol Ferry Disaster on April 16. Its music videos were released on May 6, 2014 on YouTube, then followed by its album on May 7, 2014. It reached 660,000+ preorders before its release, making it the most pre-ordered mini-album in history.

On May 15, 2014, Exo-M's leader Kris filed a lawsuit against SM Entertainment to terminate his contract citing his neglected health and the company's violation of human rights.

The Korean edition also peaked at No. 2 on Billboard's World Albums Chart, and No. 129 on the "Billboard 200", making Exo the highest charting Korean male group act on the Billboard 200 at the time.

Promotions 
Prior to EP release, Exo kickstarted their promotions with a showcase at the Jamsil Arena in Seoul on April 15, 2014. From April 1 to 9, a contest sponsored by Samsung enabled fans to enter and win tickets to attend the showcase. They promoted into their respective subgroups; Exo-K promoted in South Korea while Exo-M promoted in China. On May 24 and 25, they held their first solo concert entitled Exo from Exoplanet 1 – The Lost Planet. According to several news reports, tickets were sold out in 1.47 seconds.

Track listing
Credits adapted from Naver.

Charts

Korean and Chinese versions

Awards and nominations

Sales

Release history

References

External links 
 
 

2014 EPs
Exo EPs
Korean-language EPs
SM Entertainment EPs
Genie Music EPs
Albums produced by the Underdogs (production team)